The Redheugh Bridge is a road bridge spanning the River Tyne west of Newcastle upon Tyne city centre on the north bank and Gateshead town centre on the south bank, in North East England. It currently carries the A189 road.

The first crossing
Plans to build a bridge across the River Tyne to link the western extremities of Newcastle and Gateshead were first proposed in 1830, and were revived in 1859. Both schemes anticipated a combined road and rail bridge. The 1859 plans were thwarted by the North Eastern Railway, who had their own plans for a rail bridge. The promoter of the bridge was Richard Cail, a prominent builder in Newcastle, and he subsequently proposed a road bridge. 

Cail had formerly acted as a contractor for many of the works of the Newcastle and Gateshead Water Company, and was joined in promoting the bridge by two directors of that company, Richard Snaderson and Christian Allhusen. They formed the Redheugh Bridge and Approaches Company in 1865, and obtained an Act of Parliament to authorise the project in the following year. The Act included a clause to allow both the Water Company and the Newcastle and Gateshead Gas Company to hold up to £5,000 in shares, with the proviso that the dividend on these holdings would be one percent lower than that paid to other shareholders. Both companies were particularly interested in the bridge, since gas and water supplies between Newcastle and Gateshead were carried over the Tyne Bridge, which was about to be replaced by a swing bridge. The Tyne Commissioners had offered the Water Company £10,000 in compensation for the loss of this service, and the pipelines were carried across the river on a temporary bridge which also carried road traffic, while the swing bridge was under construction.

The bridge was designed by Thomas Bouch (later Sir Thomas), who was also the designer of the first Tay Bridge in Scotland, which failed catastrophically in December 1879, and of Hownes Gill Viaduct for the Stanhope and Tyne Railway, which still stands at Consett in County Durham, and is now used as a footpath and cycle route. Bouch's design for Redheugh consisted of a long truss, supported by three piers, one in the centre of the river and one at either side. The piers continued above the level of the truss, and were braced to it, while the truss connected to arched stone viaducts at either end. There were delays during the construction, caused by financial issues and the difficulties of getting materials to the site. It opened to pedestrians on 1 May 1871, and to all traffic in June.

Each pier had four legs, constructed from cast iron columns. Diagonal bracing from the top of the lattice towers connected to the decking one-third of the way along each span.

The design was probably unique, in that the upper beams of the trusses consisted of a tube,  in diameter, which was used as a gas main by the Gas Company. The lower beams formed a trough, and the Water Company ran their  mains through them. Once the bridge was completed, both companies were able to disconnect the mains that ran over the temporary timber bridge near the site of the swing bridge. A toll house was situated on the Newcastle side of the bridge, but revenue was less than expected, until development on the Gateshead side took place, and the income enabled healthy dividends to be paid. However, structural faults began to emerge as early as 1885, and inclined props were added to the piers to try to rectify the situation. As the faults got worse, investigation showed that repairs would cost more than a new bridge, and so it was replaced.

The second crossing

Replacement commenced in 1897 with the new bridge being built by Sir William Arrol & Co. around the old structure. Once again the process was hindered by delays in materials and an inadequate workforce. By 1900 the main girders and spans were in place and, ingeniously, hydraulic jacks were used to inch along the newly built superstructure until it rested on the previously constructed piers. The remains of the old structure were removed and the bridge was opened in August 1901. However, by the 1960s serious design flaws once again became apparent. It was seen as more economical to build a new crossing.

The present crossing

Work to replace the second crossing began in 1980. Of the original crossing, only the south abutment now remains (adorned by a modern sculpture designed by Richard Deacon).
The third bridge is very different from its two predecessors. It can carry abnormal loads of up to 400 tonnes, and has a life expectancy of 120 years. It was constructed by Edmund Nuttall Ltd to a design by Mott, Hay and Anderson's young engineer, Alan Yiu Lun Wan.

The two supporting concrete piers were fluted to create an impression of lightness and were designed to withstand the impact from a vessel of ten thousand tonnes travelling at a speed of five knots, although this is highly unlikely as large ships rarely come this far up the Tyne and the shipping lane has now effectively been blocked by the Gateshead Millennium Bridge. Due to the exposed location, strong winds can cause problems for high-sided vehicles. Early in the bridge's life, a double-decker bus was nearly blown over the side.

The bridge was opened on 18 May 1983 by the Princess of Wales. The total cost amounted to £15,350,000.

Bibliography

References

External links
 
 Gateshead Council article on the Richard Deacon sculpture
 2/22/1902;Reconstruction of the Redheugh Bridge, Newcastle.on.Tyne.

See also
Orwell Bridge

Bridges in Tyne and Wear
Bridges completed in 1871
Bridges completed in 1907
Bridges completed in 1983
Buildings and structures in Newcastle upon Tyne
Crossings of the River Tyne